Arandaspida is a taxon of very early, jawless prehistoric fish which lived during the Ordovician period.  Arandaspids represent the oldest known craniates, a proposed group of chordates that contain all chordates with a cartilage-derived skull (i.e., lampreys, armored agnathans, and gnathostomes), and hagfish. The group represents a subclass within the class Pteraspidomorphi, and contains only one order, the Arandaspidiformes. The oldest known genus of this group is Sacabambaspis found in South America.

Characteristics
The head armor of arandaspids is elongated, fusiform, with a rather flat dorsal shield, and a bulging ventral shield. In the anterior part of the dorsal shield are two closely set holes, which have been thought to be a paired pineal opening, but which are more likely the external openings of the endolymphatic ducts.

The eyes, surrounded by a sclerotic ring, are housed in a notch at the anterior end of the dorsal shield. The nostrils are not clearly located, but may have been situated between the eyes. Ventrally, the ventral lip of the mouth is armed with long series of small oral plates which recall those of heterostracans.

The gill openings are probably numerous (more than 15) and minute. They opened between the diamond-shaped platelets which separate the dorsal from the ventral shield.

The body is covered with rod-shaped scales arranged in chevrons, and the tail is probably pad-shaped and diphycercal. The dermal bones of arandaspids consist of aspidine (acellular bone) and are ornamented with oakleaf-shaped tubercles which seem to contain no dentine. The sensory-lines were housed in narrow grooves between the tubercles.

Taxonomy
Taxonomy based on the work of Mikko's Phylogeny Archive, Nelson, Grande and Wilson 2016 and van der Laan 2018.
 Order †Arandaspidiformes Ritchie & Gilbert-Tomlinson, 1977
 Family †Aseraspididae Halstead 1993
 Genus †Aseraspis Dineley & Loeffler 1976
 Family †Arandaspididae Ritchie & Gilbert-Tomlinson, 1977 [Porophoraspididae Halstead 1993; Sacabambaspidae]
 Genus †Andinaspis Gagnier, 1991 non Ritchie & Gilbert-Tomlinson, 1977
 Genus †Apedolepis Young, 1997
 Genus †Arandaspis Ritchie & Gilbert-Tomlinson, 1977
 Genus †Areyongalepis Young, 2000
 Genus †Pircanchaspis Erdtmann et al., 2000
 Genus †Porophoraspis Ritchie & Gilbert-Tomlinson, 1977
 Genus †Ritchieichthys Sansom et al., 2013
 Genus †Sacabambaspis Gagnier, Blieck & Rodrico, 1986

See also
Astraspida
Heterostraci

References

Pteraspidomorphi
Ordovician jawless fish
Vertebrate subclasses
Early Ordovician first appearances
Late Ordovician extinctions

de:Pteraspidomorphi#Arandaspida